In 2019, the total energy production in Indonesia is 450.79 Mtoe, with a total primary energy supply is 231.14 Mtoe and electricity final consumption is 263.32 TWh. Energy use in Indonesia has been long dominated by fossil resources. Once a major oil exporter in the world and joined OPEC in 1962, the country has since become a net oil importer despite still joined OPEC until 2016, making it the only net oil importer member in the organization. Indonesia is also the fourth-largest biggest coal producer and one of the biggest coal exporter in the world, with 24,910 million tons of proven coal reserves as of 2016, making it the 11th country with the most coal reserves in the world. In addition, Indonesia has abundant renewable energy potential, reaching almost 417,8 gigawatt (GW) which consisted of solar, wind, hydro, geothermal energy, ocean current, and bioenergy, although only 2,5% have been utilized. Furthermore, Indonesia along with Malaysia, have two-thirds of ASEAN's gas reserves with total annual gas production of more than 200 billion cubic meters in 2016.

The Government of Indonesia has outlined several commitments to increase clean energy use and reduce greenhouse gas emissions, among others by issuing the National Energy General Plan (RUEN) in 2017 and joining the Paris Agreement. In the RUEN, Indonesia targets New and Renewable Energy to reach 23% of the total energy mix by 2025 and 31% by 2050. The country also commits to reduce its greenhouse gas emissions by 29% by 2030 against a business-as-usual baseline scenario, and up to 41% by international support.

Indonesia has several high-profile renewable projects, such as the wind farm 75 MW in Sidenreng Rappang Regency, another wind farm 72 MW in Jeneponto Regency, and Cirata Floating Solar Power Plant in West Java with a capacity of 145 MW which will become the largest Floating Solar Power Plant in Southeast Asia.

Overview

According to IEA energy production increased 34% and export 76% from 2004 to 2008 in Indonesia.

Energy by sources 
As of 2017, Indonesia has 52,859 MW of installed electrical capacity, 36,892 MW of which are on the Java–Bali grid.

Fossil fuel energy sources

Coal

Indonesia has a lot of medium and low-quality thermal coal, and there are price caps on supplies for domestic power stations, which discourages other types of electricity generation. At current rates of production, Indonesia's coal reserves are expected to last for over 80 years. In 2009 Indonesia was the world's second top coal exporter, sending coal to China, India, Japan, Italy and other countries. Kalimantan (Borneo) and South Sumatra are the centres of coal mining. In recent years, production in Indonesia has been rising rapidly, from just over 200 mill tons in 2007 to over 400 mill tons in 2013. In 2013, the chair of the Indonesian Coal Mining Association said the production in 2014 may reach 450 mill tons.

The Indonesian coal industry is rather fragmented. Output is supplied by a few large producers and a large number of small firms. Large firms in the industry include the following:

 PT Bumi Resources (the controlling shareholder of large coal firms PT Kaltim Prima Coal and PT Arutmin Indonesia)
 PT Adaro Energy
 PT Kideco Jaya Agung
 PT Indo Tambangraya Megah 
 PT Berau Coal
 PT Tambang Batubara Bukit Asam (state-owned)

Coal production poses risks for deforestation in Kalimantan. According to one Greenpeace report, a coal plant in Indonesia has decreased the fishing catches and increased the respiratory-related diseases.

Oil

Oil is a major sector in the Indonesian economy. During the 1980s, Indonesia was a significant oil-exporting country.  Since 2000, domestic consumption has continued to rise while production has been falling, so in recent years Indonesia has begun importing increasing amounts of oil.  Within Indonesia, there are considerable amounts of oil in Sumatra, Borneo, Java, and West Papua Province. There are said to be around 60 basins across the country, only 22 of which have been explored and exploited. Main oil fields in Indonesia include the following:

 Minas. The Minas field, in Riau, Sumatra, operated by the US-based firm Chevron Pacific Indonesia, is the largest oil block in Indonesia.  Output from the field is around 20-25% of current annual oil production in Indonesia.
 Duri.  The Duri field, in Bengkalis Regency, Riau, Sumatra, is operated by the US-based firm Chevron Pacific Indonesia.
 Rokan. The Rokan field, Riau, Sumatra, operated by Chevron Pacific Indonesia, is a recently developed large field in the Rokan Hilir Regency.
 Cepu. The Cepu field, operated by Mobil Cepu Ltd which is a subsidiary of US-based Exxon Mobil, is on the border of Central and East Java near the town of Tuban.  The field was discovered in March 2001 and is estimated to have proven reserves of 600 million barrels of oil and 1.7 trillion cu feet of gas. Development of the field has been subject to on-going discussions between the operators and the Indonesian government.  Output is forecast to rise from around 20,000 bpd in early 2012 to around 165,000 bpd in late 2014.

Gas

There is growing recognition in Indonesia that the gas sector has considerable development potential.  In principle, the Indonesian government is supporting moves to give increasing priority to investment in natural gas.  In practice, private sector investors, especially foreign investors, have been reluctant to invest because many of the problems that are holding back investment in the oil sector also affect investment in gas.  In mid-2013, main potential gas fields in Indonesia were believed to include the following:

 Mahakam. The Mahakam block in East Kalimantan, under the management of Total E&P Indonesie with participation from the Japanese oil and gas firm Inpex, provides around 30% of Indonesia's natural gas output. At the time discussions were underway about the details of the future management of the block involving a proposal that Pertamina take over all or part of the management of the block. In October 2013 it was reported that Total E&P Indonesie had announced that it would stop exploration for new projects at the field. In 2015 the Energy and Resources Minister issued a regulation stipulating that the management of the block would be transferred from Total E&P Indonesie and Inpex, which had managed the field for over 50 years since 1966, to Pertamina. In late 2017, it was announced that Pertamina Hulu Indonesia, a subsidiary of Pertamina, would take over management of the block on 1 January 2018.
 Tangguh. It is hoped that annual output of the field in the near future might reach 7.6 million tons of liquefied natural gas.
 Arun. The Arun field in Aceh has been operated by ExxonMobil since the 1970s. The reserves at the field are now largely depleted so production is now slowly being phased out. ExxonMobil affiliates also operate the nearby South Lhoksukon A and D fields as well as the North Sumatra offshore gas field. In September 2015, ExxonMobil Indonesia sold its assets in Aceh to Pertamina. The sale included the divestment by ExxonMobil of its assets (100%) in the North Sumatra Offshore block, its interests (100%) in B block, and its stake (30%) in the PT Arun Natural Gas Liquefaction (NGL) plant. Following the completion of the deal, Pertamina will have an 85% stake in the Arun NGL plant.
 East Natuna. The East Natuna gas field (formerly known as Natuna D-Alpha) in the Natuna Islands in the South China Sea is believed to be one of the biggest gas reserves in Southeast Asia. The aim is to begin expanded production in 2020 with production rising to  sustained for perhaps 20 years.
 Banyu Urip.  The Banyu Urip field, a major field for Indonesia, is in the Cepu block in Bojonegoro Regency in East Java. Interests in the block are held by Pertamina (45%) through its subsidiary PT Pertamina EP Cepu and ExxonMobil Cepu Limited (45%) which is a subsidiary of ExxonMobil Corporation.  ExxonMobil is the operator of the block.
Masela. The Masela field, currently (early 2016) under consideration for development by the Indonesian Government, is situated to the east of Timor Island, roughly halfway between Timor and Darwin in Australia.  The main investors in the field are currently (early 2016) Inpex and Shell who hold stakes of 65% and 35% respectively.  The field, if developed, is likely to become the biggest deepwater gas project in Indonesia, involving an estimated investment of between $14–19 billion. Over  of gas are said to exist in the block. However, development of the field is being delayed over uncertainty as to whether the field might be operated through an offshore or onshore processing facility.  In March 2016, after a row between his ministers, President Jokowi decreed that the processing facility should be onshore.  This change of plans will involve the investors in greatly increased costs and will delay the start of the project. It was proposed that they submit revised Plans of Development (POD) to the Indonesian Government.
 See also List of gas fields in Indonesia.

Shale
There is potential for tight oil and shale gas in northern Sumatra and eastern Kalimantan. Pertamina has taken the lead in using hydraulic fracturing to explore for shale gas in northern Sumatra. Chevron Pacific Indonesia and NuEnergy Gas are also pioneers in using fracking in existing oil fields and in new exploration. Environmental concerns and a government-imposed cap on oil prices present barriers to full development of the substantial shale deposits in the country. Sulawesi, Seram, Buru, Irian Jaya in eastern Indonesia have shales that were deposited in marine environments which may be more brittle and thus more suitable for fracking than the source rocks in western Indonesia which have higher clay content.

Coal bed methane
With  of coal bed methane (CBM) reserve mainly in Kalimantan and Sumatra, Indonesia has potential to redraft its energy charts as United States with its shale gas.

Renewable energy sources  

Indonesia has set a target of 23% and 31% of its energy to come from renewable sources by 2025 and 2050 respectively. In 2020, Renewable in Indonesia has contributed 11.2% to the national energy mix, with hydro and geothermal power plants making up the largest share. Despite the substantial renewable energy potential, Indonesia is still struggling to achieve its renewable target. The lack of adequate regulation supports to attract the private sector and the regulation inconsistency are often cited among the main reasons for the problems. One policy requires private investors to transfer their projects to PLN (the sole electricity off-taker in the country) at the end of agreement periods, which, combined with the fact that the Minister for Energy and Mineral Resources sets the consumer price of energy, has led to concern about return on investment.

Another issue is related to financing, as to achieve the 23% target, Indonesia needs an investment of about US$154 billion. The state is unable to allocate this huge amount meanwhile there is reluctance from both potential investors and lending banks to get involved. In addition, renewable energy resources have characteristics, such as being highly spread and located in remote areas, cannot be transported, and the intermittency of solar and wind power plant, raising concerns related to grid reliability. There is also a critical challenge related to cost. The initial investment of the renewable projects is still high and as the electricity price has to be below the Region Generation Cost (BPP) (which is already low enough in some major areas), it makes the project unattractive. Indonesia also has large coal reserves and is one of the world's largest net exporters of coal, making it less urgent to develop renewable-based power plants compared to countries that depend on coal imports.

It is recommended that the country removes subsidies for fossil fuels, establishes a ministry of renewable energy, improves grid management, mobilizes domestic resources to support renewable energy, and facilitates market entry for international investors. Continued reliance on fossil fuels by Indonesia may leave its coal assets stranded and result in significant investments lost as renewable energy is rapidly becoming cost-efficient worldwide.

In February 2020, it was announced that the People's Consultative Assembly is preparing its first renewable energy bill.

Biomass 
An estimated 55% of Indonesia's population, 128 million people, primarily rely upon traditional biomass (mainly wood) for cooking.  Reliance on this source of energy has the disadvantage that poor people in rural areas have little alternative but to collect timber from forests, and often cut down trees, to collect wood for cooking.

A pilot project of Palm Oil Mill Effluent (POME) Power Generator with the capacity of 1 Megawatt has been inaugurated in September 2014.

Hydroelectricity

Indonesia has 75 GW of hydro potential, although only around 5 GW has been utilized. Indonesia also set a target of 2 GW installed capacity in hydroelectricity, including 0.43 GW micro-hydro, by 2025.

Geothermal energy

Indonesia uses some geothermal energy. According to the Renewable Energy Policy Network's Renewables 2013 Global Status Report, Indonesia has the third largest installed generating capacity in the world. With 1.3 GW installed capacity, Indonesia trails only the United States (3.4 GW) and the Philippines (1.9 GW), ahead of Mexico (1.0 GW), Italy (0.9 GW), New Zealand (0.8 GW), Iceland (0.7 GW), and Japan (0.5 GW). The current official policy is to encourage the increased use of geothermal energy for electricity production.  Geothermal sites in Indonesia include the Wayang Windu Geothermal Power Station and the Kamojang plant, both in West Java.

The development of the sector has been proceeding rather more slowly than hoped.  Expansion appears to be held up by a range of technical, economic, and policy issues which have attracted considerable comment in Indonesia.  However, it has proved difficult to formulate policies to respond to the problems.

Two new plants are slated to open in 2020, at Dieng Volcanic Complex in Central Java and at Mount Patuha in West Java.

Wind power

On average, low wind speeds mean that for many locations there is limited scope for large-scale energy generation from wind in Indonesia. Only small (<10 kW) and medium (<100 kW) generators are feasible. For Sumba Island in East Nusa Tengarra (NTT), according to NREL, three separate technical assessments have found that "Sumba’s wind resources could be strong enough to be economically viable, with the highest estimated wind speeds ranging from 6.5 m/s to 8.2 m/s on an annual average basis."
A very small amount of (off-grid) electricity is generated using wind power.  For example, a small plant was established at Pandanmino, a small village on the south coast of Java in Bantul Regency, Yogyakarta Province, in 2011.  However, it was established as an experimental plant and it is not clear whether funding for long-term maintenance will be available.

In 2018, Indonesia installed its first wind farm, the 75 MW Sidrap, in Sidenreng Rappang Regency, South Sulawesi, which is the biggest wind farm in Southeast Asia. In 2019, Indonesia installed another wind farm with a capacity of 72 MW, in Jeneponto Regency, South Sulawesi.

Solar power
The Indonesian solar PV sector is relatively underdeveloped but has significant potential, up to 207 GW with utilization in the country is less than 1%. However, for a range of reasons, it is unlikely that it will be practical to expand electricity output from solar sources in Indonesia quickly. A range of regulation, technical, financial, economic, and social constraints, including lack of consistent and supportive policies, the absence of attractive tariff and incentives, as well as concerns about on-grid readiness is likely to become the main challenges on the rapid installation of solar power in Indonesia, including in rural areas.

Use of energy

Transport sector 
Much energy in Indonesia is used for domestic transportation. The dominance of private vehicles - mostly cars and motorbikes - in Indonesia has led to an enormous demand for fuel. Energy consumption in the transport sector is growing by about 4.5% every year. There is therefore an urgent need for policy reform and infrastructure investment to enhance the energy efficiency of transport, particularly in urban areas.

There are large opportunities to reduce both the energy consumption from the transport sector, for example through the adoption of higher energy efficiency standards for private cars/motorbikes and expanding mass transit networks. Many of these measures would be more cost-effective than the current transport systems. There is also scope to reduce the carbon intensity of transport energy, particularly through replacing diesel with biodiesel or through electrification. Both would require comprehensive supply chain analysis to ensure that the biofuels and power plants are not having wider environmental impacts such as deforestation or air pollution.

Electricity sector 
Access to electricity

Over 50% of households in 2011 had an electricity connection. An estimated 63 million people in 2011 did not have direct access to electricity.

However, by 2019, 98.9% of the population had access to electricity.

Organisations

The electricity sector, dominated by the state-owned electricity utility Perusahaan Listrik Negara, is another major consumer of primary energy.

Government policy

Major energy companies in Indonesia

Indonesian firms

 Pertamina, the state-owned oil company
 Pertamina Gas Negara, the state-owned gas company, subsidiary of Pertamina
 Perusahaan Listrik Negara, the state-owned electricity company.
 PT Bumi Resources owned by the Bakrie Group
 PT Medco Energi International, the largest publicly listed oil and gas company in Indonesia
 Adaro Energy, one of the largest coal mining companies in Indonesia

Foreign firms

 US-based firm PT Chevron Pacific Indonesia is the largest producer of crude oil in Indonesia; Chevron produces (2014) around 40% of the crude oil in Indonesia
 Total E&P Indonesia which operates the East Mahakam field in Kalimantan and other fields
 ExxonMobil is one of the main foreign operators in Indonesia
 Equinor, a Norwegian multinational firm, which has been operating in Indonesia since 2007, especially in Eastern Indonesia
 BP which is a major LNG operator in the Tangguh gas field in West Papua.
 ConocoPhillips which currently operates four production-sharing contracts including at Natuna and in Sumatra.
 Inpex, a Japanese firm established in 1966 as North Sumatra Offshore Petroleum Exploration Co. Ltd.

Greenhouse gas emissions

The  emissions of Indonesia in total were over Italy in 2009. However, in all greenhouse gas emissions including construction and deforestation in 2005 Indonesia was top-4 after China, US and
Brazil. The carbon intensity of electricity generation is higher than most other countries at over 600 g/kWh.

See also 

 Nuclear power in Indonesia
 List of power stations in Indonesia
 Rural electrification
 List of main infrastructure projects in Indonesia
 List of renewable energy topics by country
 List of gas fields in Indonesia

References